National Highway 275 (NH-275), also commonly referred to as Bengaluru–Mysuru Expressway, part of the Bangalore–Mangalore Economic Corridor (EC-34), is a national highway that starts from Bengaluru and goes through Mysuru as a 10-lane expressway of , and again as 4-lane till Madikeri, and ends at Bantwal.
This highway connects the coastal city of Mangaluru to Bengaluru. It is also a bypass route for the National Highway 75 (NH-75). The Bengaluru to Mysuru section of this highway was upgraded from 4 to 10 lanes, out of which the 6-lane section is the main elevated access-controlled carriageway and the other 2-lane section on both ends of the carriageway are service roads. It has reduced the travel time between Bengaluru and Mysuru from 3.5 hours to only 90 minutes.

Bengaluru-Mysuru section 

It has been built at a cost of ₹ 8,000 crore and was developed in two phases. Phase-1 of  length connecting Bengaluru and Nidaghatta, and Phase-2 of  connecting Nidaghatta and Mysuru. The foundation stone for the project was laid in March 2018.

Status updates
 Mar 2018: Foundation stone laid for the project.
 Apr 2018: Contract awarded for Phase-1 to Bhopal-based Dilip Buildcon.
 Mar 2019: Civil work which got stuck due to land acquisition issues to start by April 2019.
 Jul 2020: Work on Phase-1 started in May 2019 and work on Phase-2 started in Dec 2019. Both phase are seeing delay due to COVID-19 related problems, which caused labour shortages and several delays in work. It may see the deadline of January 2022; to get further delayed.
Dec 2021: Work on Phase-1 completed upto 83% and Phase II completed upto 73%. The expressway  is expected to become operational by October 2022.
Feb 2023: The expressway is at its final stages of construction work, and will be inaugurated by Prime Minister Narendra Modi on 11 March 2023.
March 2023: The expressway was inaugurated by Prime Minister Narendra Modi on 12 March 2023.

See also
Bangalore-Mysore Infrastructure Corridor (NICE Road)
National Highway 66 (India)
National Highway 75 (India)
National Highway 73 (India)
National Highway 169 (India)
National Highway 206 (India)
National Highway 52 (India)
Ghat Roads

References

External links
 NH 275 on OpenStreetMap

National highways in India
81
Transport in Bangalore
Transport in Mysore